De Soto commonly refers to

 Hernando de Soto (c. 1495 – 1542), Spanish explorer
 DeSoto (automobile), an American automobile brand from 1928 to 1961

De Soto, DeSoto, Desoto, or de Soto may also refer to:

Places in the United States of America 
Populated places
 De Soto, Georgia 
 De Soto, Illinois 
 De Soto, Iowa 
 De Soto, Kansas 
 De Soto, Mississippi
 De Soto, Missouri 
 De Soto, Nebraska 
 De Soto, Wisconsin
 DeSoto, Indiana
 DeSoto, Texas

Administrative divisions
 De Soto Parish, Louisiana
 DeSoto County, Florida
 DeSoto County, Mississippi

Parks and geographic features
 De Soto National Forest in Mississippi
 DeSoto Falls (Alabama)
 DeSoto Falls (Georgia)
 DeSoto Lake, a lake in Georgia
 DeSoto National Wildlife Refuge, in Nebraska and Iowa
 Fort De Soto Park in St. Petersburg, Florida
 De Soto National Memorial in Bradenton, Florida
 DeSoto Site Historic State Park in Tallahassee, Florida

People 
 de Soto (surname)

Other uses 
The DeSoto, historic hotel in Savannah, Georgia
 DESOTO patrols, conducted by the U.S. Navy to collect signals intelligence in hostile waters
 DeSoto Records, a record label
 USS De Soto County (LST-1171), a post-war Landing Ship Tank of the US Navy
 De Soto station, Los Angeles

See also 
Soto (disambiguation)